Ryan Bozak (born January 3, 1947 in Swift Current, Saskatchewan) is a retired National Hockey League linesman. His career started in 1972 and ended in 1994, which was the final season before the league changed over to the current numbering system for officials the next year.  During his career, he officiated 1,528 regular season games and two All-Star games. Ryan is the son of Billy Bozak, who was trainer of the San Diego Gulls and eventually the Winnipeg Jets.

References
 The National Hockey League Official Guide & Record Book/1993-94

1947 births
Living people
Ice hockey people from Saskatchewan
National Hockey League officials
People from Swift Current